Allamraju Subrahmanyakavi (1831–1892) was a Telugu writer.

Biography
Allamraju was born in Pithapuram in Andhra Pradesh and belonged to the Brahmin caste. His parents were Gangamamba and Rangasai. He studied literature from his guru, Nagabhatla Narasakavi. He was a protégé of Krishnabhupathi, the head of Sthansthana Madugula Sthansthana from 1853 to 1869. He was also a protégé at Gangadhararamarao of Pithapuram Sansthanam in 1869.

Writings
 Srikrishna Bhupathilama Satakam (1853)
 Sesha Dharmamulu (poetry) (1867)
 Papayamantri Satakam 
 Atmabodhamu (poetry in Telugu) (1875)
 Manidhvaja Charitramu.
 Simhadri Ramadhipa Satakam (1876)
 Bhadraparinayam (1978)
 Srikrishna Lila Kalyanam (1978)
 Chatudhara Camatkarasaram

References

External links
 Andhra Rachayitalu : Madhunapantula satyanarayana sastry, 1940. Pages: 63-8.
 Pithapura sansthanamu- kavipandithaposhana  - P.hd book by C.Kamala anarkali-1973

Telugu poets
1831 births
1892 deaths